Dystrophic lakes, also known as humic lakes, are lakes that contain high amounts of humic substances and organic acids. The presence of these substances causes the water to be brown in colour and have a generally low pH of around 4.0-6.0.  Due to these acidic conditions, there is little biodiversity able to survive, consisting mostly of algae, phytoplankton, picoplankton, and bacteria. Ample research has been performed on the many dystrophic lakes located in Eastern Poland, but dystrophic lakes can be found in many areas of the world.

Classification of dystrophic lakes

Lakes can be categorized according to the increasing productivity as oligotrophic, mesotrophic, eutrophic, and hypereutrophic.  Dystrophic lakes used to be classified as oligotrophic due to their low productivity.  However, more recent research shows dystrophia can be associated with  any of the trophic types.  This is due to a wider possible pH range (acidic 4.0 to more neutral 8.0 on occasion) and other fluctuating properties like nutrient availability and chemical composition.  Therefore, dystrophia can be categorized as a condition affecting trophic state rather than a trophic state in itself

Chemical properties

Dystrophic lakes have a high level of dissolved organic carbon. This consists of contains organic carboxylic and phenolic acids, which keep water pH levels relatively stable by acting as a natural buffer. Therefore, the lake’s naturally acidic pH is largely unaffected by industrial emissions.  Dissolved organic carbon also reduces the entry of ultraviolet radiation and can reduce the bioavailability of heavy metals by binding them. There is a significantly lowered calcium content in the water and sediment of a dystrophic lake when compared with a regular lake. Essential fatty acids, like EPA and DHA, are still present in the organisms in humic lakes, but are downgraded in nutritional quality by this acidic environment, resulting low nutritional quality of dystrophic lake's producers, such as phytoplankton. 
Hydrochemical Dystrophy Index is a scale used to evaluate the dystrophy level of lakes.  In 2016, Gorniak proposed a new set of rules for evaluating this index, using properties such as the surface water pH, electric conductivity, and concentrations of dissolved inorganic carbon, and dissolved organic carbon.  
Because of different preexisting trophic status, lakes affected by dystrophia may differ strongly in their chemical composition from other dystrophic lakes.  Studies of the chemical composition of dystrophic lakes have shown heightened levels of dissolved inorganic nitrogen and higher activities of lipase and glucosidase in polyhummic lakes when compared with oligohumic lakes.  In oligohumic lakes, the surface microlayers have higher levels of phosphatase activity than the subsurface microlayers. The opposite is true when the lake is polyhumic.  Both oligohumic and polyhumic lakes show higher aminopeptidase activity in the subsurface microlayers than in the surface microlayers.

Life in dystrophic lakes

The catchment area of a dystrophic lake is usually a coniferous forest rich with peat mosses that spread along the water surface. Despite the presence of ample nutrients, dystrophic lakes can be considered nutrient-poor, because their nutrients are trapped in organic matter, and therefore are unavailable to primary producers. The organic matter in dystrophic lakes is mainly allochthonous: it is terrestrially derived: organic matter removed in the catchment area gradually fills this aquatic environment. Due to this organic matter rich environment, it is bacterioplankton that controls for the rate of nutrient flux between the aquatic and terrestrial environments.  The bacteria are found in high numbers and have great growth potentials despite dystrophic conditions. These bacteria drive the food web of humic lakes by providing energy and supplying usable forms of organic and inorganic carbon to other organisms, primarily to phagotrophic and mixotrophic flagellates.  Decomposition of organic matter by bacteria converts also organic nitrogen and phosphorus into their inorganic forms which are now available for uptake by  primary producers which includes both large and small phytoplankton (algae and cyanobacteria). The biological activity of humic lakes is, however, dominated by bacterial metabolism, which dominates the food web.  The  chemistry of humic lakes makes it difficult for higher trophic levels such as planktivorous fish to establish themselves, leaving a simplified food web consisting mostly of plants, plankton, and bacteria. The dominance of the bacteria means that the dystrophic lakes have a higher respiration rate than primary production rate.

Impacts of dystrophication on a lake ecosystem

The formation of a humic lake via organic runoff has a dramatic effect on the lake ecosystem.  Chemical composition changes that increase the lake’s acidity make it difficult for fish and other organisms to proliferate.  The quality of the lake for use as drinking water also decreases as the carbon concentration and acidity increase. The fish that do adapt to the increased acidity may also not be fit for human consumption, due to the organic pollutants. Concentrations and mobility of heavy metals may also be altered as a result of changes in chemical composition of a humic lake.

Dystrophic lakes and climate change

Lakes are commonly known to be important sinks in the carbon cycle.  Due to their high levels of dissolved organic carbon, dystrophic lakes are significantly larger carbon sinks than clear lakes. The elevated levels of carbon concentrations in humic lakes are affected by vegetation patterns in the catchment area, the runoff from which is the main source of organic material.  However, changes in these levels can also be attributed to shifts in precipitation, modifications of soil mineralization rates, reduced sulphate deposition, and changes in temperature.  All these factors can be affected by changes in climate. Contemporary climate change is expected to increase the supply of organic carbon to lakes and therefore change the character of some to the dystrophic one.

Examples of dystrophic lakes

Examples of dystrophic lakes that have been studied by scientists include Lake Suchar II in Poland, lakes Allgjuttern, Fiolen, and Brunnsjön in Sweden, and Lake Matheson in New Zealand.

References 

Lakes by type
Aquatic ecology
Limnology